The 1958 Cal Poly Pomona Broncos football team represented the Cal Poly Kellogg-Voorhis Unit—now known as California State Polytechnic University, Pomona—as an independent during the 1958 NCAA College Division football season. Led by second-year head coach Don Warhurst, Cal Poly Pomona compiled a record of 7–3. The team outscored its opponents 275 to 150 for the season. The Broncos played home games in Pomona Catholic High School in Pomona, California.

Schedule

Notes

References

Cal Poly Pomona
Cal Poly Pomona Broncos football seasons
Cal Poly Pomona Broncos football